Hampton  is a community in the Canadian province of Nova Scotia, located in Annapolis County. It overlooks the Bay of Fundy and a lighthouse was built here in 1911.

References

Communities in Annapolis County, Nova Scotia